Manhattan is a town in Gallatin County, Montana, United States. The population was 2,086 at the 2020 census. It is part of the 'Bozeman Micropolitan Statistical Area'.

History 
In 1865, the town was called Hamilton. This changed in 1883 when they named it Moreland after the Moreland Irrigation Canal. Eventually it was changed to Manhattan after a malting company in the rise of the barley empire.

Geography

Manhattan is located at  (45.857367, -111.331005). Interstate 90 passes by town, with access via exit 288. The Gallatin River is east of town.

Climate
This climatic region is typified by large seasonal temperature differences, with warm to hot (and often humid) summers and cold (sometimes severely cold) winters.  According to the Köppen Climate Classification system, Manhattan has a humid continental climate, abbreviated "Dfb" on climate maps.

Demographics

2010 census
As of the census of 2010, there were 1,520 people, 622 households, and 405 families living in the town. The racial makeup of the town was 96.2% White, 0.1% African American, 0.3% Native American, 0.7% Asian, 0.1% Pacific Islander, 0.3% from other races, and 2.3% from two or more races. Hispanic or Latino of any race were 2.6% of the population.

There were 622 households, of which 31.2% had children under the age of 18 living with them, 54.3% were married couples living together, 6.6% had a female householder with no husband present, 4.2% had a male householder with no wife present, and 34.9% were non-families. 29.6% of all households were made up of individuals, and 12.8% had someone living alone who was 65 years of age or older. The average household size was 2.40 and the average family size was 3.02.

The median age in the town was 41.2 years. 25.8% of residents were under the age of 18; 4.7% were between the ages of 18 and 24; 24.9% were from 25 to 44; 29.5% were from 45 to 64; and 15.2% were 65 years of age or older. The gender makeup of the town was 51.1% male and 48.9% female.

2000 census
As of the census of 2000, there were 1,396 people, 553 households, and 389 families living in the town. The population density was 2,303.9 people per square mile (883.6/km2). There were 582 housing units at an average density of 960.5 per square mile (368.4/km2). The racial makeup of the town was 97.42% White, 0.72% Native American, 0.29% Asian, 0.07% Pacific Islander, 0.43% from other races, and 1.07% from two or more races. Hispanic or Latino of any race were 0.93% of the population. In the 1800s a colony of Dutch farmers settled here and grew large amounts of barley, which was used by Bozeman, Montana brewers.

There were 553 households, out of which 33.6% had children under the age of 18 living with them, 61.3% were married couples living together, 4.7% had a female householder with no husband present, and 29.5% were non-families. 24.6% of all households were made up of individuals, and 10.1% had someone living alone who was 65 years of age or older. The average household size was 2.52 and the average family size was 3.03.

In the town, the population was spread out, with 26.6% under the age of 18, 7.7% from 18 to 24, 29.7% from 25 to 44, 22.8% from 45 to 64, and 13.1% who were 65 years of age or older. The median age was 38 years. For every 100 females there were 105.9 males. For every 100 females age 18 and over, there were 98.8 males.

The median income for a household in the town was $38,242, and the median income for a family was $45,521. Males had a median income of $31,319 versus $19,875 for females. The per capita income for the town was $17,024. About 5.2% of families and 7.1% of the population were below the poverty line, including 7.5% of those under age 18 and 12.4% of those age 65 or over.

Education
Manhattan School District #3 educates students from kindergarten through 12th grade. Manhattan High School's team name is the Tigers. Manhattan Christian High School is known as the Eagles.

Manhattan has a public library, the Manhattan Community Library, which is part of the Manhattan High School.

Popular culture
In the mid-1990s the town of Manhattan was featured on the "Real Food for Real People" national advertising campaign by the Beef Industry.

References

Towns in Gallatin County, Montana